Ángel Ojeda Allauca (born 11 August 1992) is a Peruvian footballer who plays as a midfielder for Binacional in the Torneo Descentralizado.

Club career
Ángel Ojeda made his debut in the Torneo Descentralizado on 15 May 2010 coming on as a late substitute for Nórbil Romero in the 2–0 away loss to Sport Boys. Manager Carlos Manta then allowed him to make his home debut as a starter the following round, but his side fell 1–4 against Universidad San Martín. Ojeda finished his debut season with 12 league appearances.

References

1992 births
Living people
Association football midfielders
Peruvian footballers
FBC Melgar footballers
Unión Comercio footballers
Peruvian Primera División players
Deportivo Binacional FC players